Mega Man: Upon a Star, known in Japan as , is a Japanese anime original video animation (OVA) series based on the popular Capcom video game franchise Mega Man, produced by Universal Multimedia Entertainment, Capcom and Ashi Productions (who also worked on the American Mega Man cartoon in 1994). The OVA was presented by the Japan Center for Intercultural Communications, and acts as a series of educational shorts on the culture of Japan. The episodes were produced circa 1993-1994, and would not be released to home media until a Japanese DVD release by Capcom on September 20, 2002, followed by a release in North America by ADV Films on January 4, 2005, although the order of episodes 1 and 2 from the Japanese release was switched for this release. It loosely adapts the events of Mega Man 5 along with original story elements.

Plot 
In the early 1990s, Yuuta Kobayashi is a Japanese boy who plays the game Mega Man 5, but forgets to turn off his console when going to bed. Mega Man along with his friends and foes manage to exit the "video game world" to Japan in the "real world". Dr. Wily quickly attempts to conquer the real world, and Mega Man teams up with the Kobayashi family to search for Dr. Wily. Yuuta's father takes Mega Man to Tokyo to search for Dr. Wily and finds him in an amusement park. Dr. Wily orders all the robots in a giant machine called Samurai Man. Mega Man is able to defeat it by Charge Kicking a football, but Dr. Wily escapes. Yuuta summons Eddie to replenish the energy of Mega Man. Rush flies with Mega Man and Yuuta across Japan to search for Dr. Wily. Meanwhile they learn about Japanese culture and customs such as Japanese New Years, Setsubun, Hinamatsuri, and Children's Day. Eventually, they discover that Dr. Wily built a secret base inside Mount Fuji and uses the volcanic energy to create Lava Man. Yuuta's sister Akane summons Proto Man and Beat to help Mega Man. While Proto Man and Beat take care of the lava robots, Mega Man breaks into Wily's lab to beat all eight of Wily's Robot Masters. Wily makes his escape in a rocket, but Proto Man diverts his rocket to go back into Yuuta's video game. After celebrating Wily's defeat, the game characters return to the game world.

Mega Man and Roll get pulled out of the game world by Yuuta and Akane and are taken to the Obon matsuri. Mega Man and Yuuta carry the mikoshi in a parade, Roll learns about yukatas and makes a promise with Akane that she will wear a kimono on Shichi-Go-San, Mega Man learns about cotton candy, Roll plays Whac-A-Mole, and the kids watch the fireworks. During the time everyone is gone, Dr. Wily escapes the game world with his updated Skulker and kidnaps Proto Man. Dr. Light repairs the time machine and Mega Man and Roll use it to jump ahead one year in time only to discover that Wily has conquered Japan and raised the entire city of Tokyo high above the surface. Mega Man and Roll jump back to the past and discover that a typhoon is responsible for this. But, this is not an ordinary typhoon... this is the work of Dr. Wily and his new Typhoon Robot! Can Mega Man save Proto Man, and save the city from certain doom? Along the way, Mega Man learns about Tsukimi (and its yummy dango!) and Sports Day.

Episode list

Voice Cast

Additional voices were performed in English by Brent Chapman and David Kaye.

References

External links
Information at the Mega Man Home Page
Mega Man: Upon a Star in The Mechanical Maniacs

1993 anime OVAs
1995 anime OVAs
2002 anime OVAs
2005 anime OVAs
ADV Films
Animated series based on Mega Man
Ashi Productions
OVAs based on video games